The 2017 UCI Mountain Bike World Championships was the 28th edition of the UCI Mountain Bike World Championships. As in 2016, the championships in the various disciplines were held at separate events. The world championships in four-cross were held at Val di Sole, Italy, on 24 and 25 August 2017, alongside UCI World Cup events in cross-country and downhill. The world championships in cross-country and downhill were held in Cairns, Australia, from 5 to 10 September 2017.

The UCI world championships in trials, which had been held alongside the UCI Mountain Bike World Championships since 2000, were run as part of the newly created UCI Urban Cycling World Championships in 2017. The Urban Cycling World Championships also included the UCI world championships in cross-country eliminator, which had been part of the UCI Mountain Bike World Championships since 2012, and in BMX freestyle.

The Cairns event marked the second time the UCI Mountain Bike World Championships had been held in Cairns and the third time the event was held in Australia, following the 1996 edition in Cairns and the 2009 edition in Canberra. This was the third consecutive year that the UCI World Championships in four-cross were held in Val di Sole.

Medal summary

Men's events

Women's events

Team events

Medal table

See also
2017 UCI Mountain Bike World Cup

References

External links
MTB calendar on the UCI website
Official website of the Val di Sole event
Official website of the Cairns event

UCI Mountain Bike World Championships
International cycle races hosted by Italy
International cycle races hosted by Australia
2017 in mountain biking
2017 in Italian sport
2017 in Australian sport
August 2017 sports events in Europe
UCI Mountain Bike World Cup